Grace Bantebya Kyomuhendo (born October 2, 1963)  is a Ugandan professor of Women and Gender Studies, advocate for gender equality, social transformation and respect for women’s rights. She is also a social anthropologist, feminist and social norms researcher and a lecturer at Makerere University. Her and Marjorie Keniston McIntosh authored a book called Women, Work and Domestic Virtue in Uganda 1900-2003 which won the Aidoo-Snyder Prize.

Early life And education 
Bantebya was born in Hoima District. In 1987, she attained her Bachelor of Arts, Social Sciences Makerere University Kampala Uganda. In 1990, she also attained her Master of Philosophy (MPhil) Social Anthropology, Cambridge University and her PhD Sociology and Social Anthropology Hull University United Kingdom in 1997.

Publications 
Bantebya was the Principal investigator (PI) on the “Whole University Approach: Kicking Sexual Harassment out of Higher Education Institutions in Uganda” (KISH Project). She was also a PI of the International Development Research Centre (IDRC) Growth Opportunities for Women (GrOW) project. She was also a Co-PI of the Eastern African Social and Gender Norms Learning Collaborative (EALC)Network hosted by Makerere University, School of Women and Gender Studies and CARE International Uganda.

She published Transforming the Lives of Girls and Young women in Uganda, Viet Nam, Ethiopia and Nepal; Strengthening Linkages between Poverty Reduction Strategies and Child Protection Initiatives and both projects were commissioned by the Overseas Development Institute United Kingdom(UK), Shame, Social Exclusion and the Effectiveness of Anti-poverty Programme supported by Economic and Social Research Council (ESRC). She also published Theory of change and impact policy evaluation in cross-national settings,  and  the recent one Prevention of Sexual Harassment in Higher Education Institutions in Uganda.

Career 
Bantebye is a member of the Vice-Chancellor’s one hundred eminent member Committee for investigating Sexual Harassment (SH) at Makerere University. She has chaired a number of Sexual Harassment allegations against staff to their conclusion. She is one of the International Sexual Exploitation and abuse (SEA) investigator under CARE international Uganda office. She also spearheaded the project called Strengthening the Resilience and Empowerment of Women Smallholder Farmers in Uganda. She was also the Chairperson Uganda Women’s Network and patron of Women agriculturalist and environmentalist association. She also served on the Uganda civil society capacity Building Committee funded by European Union and chairperson National Quality Assurance Certification Mechanism Council.

Books 
 Grace Bantebya Kyomuhendo & Marjorie Keniston McIntosh (2006), Women, Work & Domestic Virtue in Uganda: 1900 – 2003.  Jointly published by James Currey . ‐ Oxford Ohio University Press ‐ Athens and Fountain Publishers  
 Grace Bantebya Kyomuhendo (2005) (Ed), Women’s Health, National and International Perspective.    Published by Women and Gender Studies Makerere University, Makerere University Printery

External links 
 Women's Health, National and. International Perspective
 Social institutions as mediating sites for changing gender norms

References 

1963 births
Makerere University alumni
Academic staff of Makerere University
Living people
Alumni of the University of Cambridge
People from Hoima District